Inflectarius is a genus of air-breathing land snails, terrestrial pulmonate gastropod mollusks in the family Polygyridae.

Species 
Species in the genus Inflectarius include:
 Inflectarius approximans (G. H. Clapp, 1905) – tight-gapped shagreen
 Inflectarius downieanus (Bland, 1861) – dwarf globelet
 Inflectarius edentatus (Sampson, 1889) – smooth-lip shagreen
 Inflectarius ferrissi (Pilsbry, 1897) – Smoky Mountain covert
 Inflectarius inflectus (Say, 1821) – shagreen
 Inflectarius kalmianus (Hubricht, 1965) – brown globelet
 Inflectarius magazinensis (Pilsbry & Ferriss, 1907) – Magazine Mountain middle-toothed snail
 Inflectarius rugeli (Shuttleworth, 1852) – deep-tooth shagreen
 Inflectarius smithi (G. H. Clapp, 1905) – Alabama shagreen
 Inflectarius subpalliatus (Pilsbry, 1893) – velvet covert
 Inflectarius verus (Hubricht, 1954)

References 

Polygyridae
Gastropod genera
Taxa named by Henry Augustus Pilsbry
Taxonomy articles created by Polbot